The Department of Health and Aged Care was an Australian government department that existed between October 1998 and November 2001.

The Department was created after the 1998 federal election, named to reflect new departmental responsibilities and functions.

Scope
Information about the department's functions and/or government funding allocation could be found in the Administrative Arrangements Orders, the annual Portfolio Budget Statements, in the Department's annual reports and on the Department's website.

According to the Administrative Arrangements Order (AAO) made on 21 October 1998, the Department dealt with:
Services for the aged, including carers
Public health and medical research 
Health promotion and disease prevention
Primary health care of Aboriginal and Torres Strait Islander people
Pharmaceutical benefits
Health benefits schemes
Specific health services, including human quarantine 
National drug abuse strategy
Regulation of quality of therapeutic goods

Structure
The Department was an Australian Public Service department, staffed by officials who were responsible to the Minister for Health and Aged Care, Michael Wooldridge.

The Secretary of the Department was Andrew Podger.

References

Ministries established in 1998
Health and Aged Care
1998 establishments in Australia
2001 disestablishments in Australia